Levi Risamasu (born 23 November 1982) is a Dutch former footballer who played as a midfielder.

Career statistics
Source:

References

Living people
1982 births
People from Nieuwerkerk aan den IJssel
Association football midfielders
Dutch footballers
Dutch people of Indonesian descent
Dutch people of Moluccan descent
NAC Breda players
AGOVV Apeldoorn players
Excelsior Rotterdam players
Eredivisie players
Eerste Divisie players
Footballers from South Holland